In mathematics, mathematical physics and the theory of stochastic processes, a harmonic function is a twice continuously differentiable function  where  is an open subset of  that satisfies Laplace's equation, that is,

This is usually written as

or

Etymology of the term "harmonic"
The descriptor "harmonic" in the name harmonic function originates from a point on a taut string which is undergoing harmonic motion. The solution to the differential equation for this type of motion can be written in terms of sines and cosines, functions which are thus referred to as harmonics. Fourier analysis involves expanding functions on the unit circle in terms of a series of these harmonics. Considering higher dimensional analogues of the harmonics on the unit n-sphere, one arrives at the spherical harmonics. These functions satisfy Laplace's equation and over time "harmonic" was used to refer to all functions satisfying Laplace's equation.

Examples 
Examples of harmonic functions of two variables are:
 The real and imaginary parts of any holomorphic function.
 The function  defined on  This can describe the electric potential due to a line charge or the gravity potential due to a long cylindrical mass.

Examples of harmonic functions of three variables are given in the table below with 

{| class="wikitable"
! Function !! Singularity
|-
|align=center|
|Unit point charge at origin
|-
|align=center|
|x-directed dipole at origin
|-
|align=center|
|Line of unit charge density on entire z-axis
|-
|align=center|
|Line of unit charge density on negative z-axis
|-
|align=center|
|Line of x-directed dipoles on entire z axis
|-
|align=center|
|Line of x-directed dipoles on negative z axis
|}

Harmonic functions that arise in physics are determined by their singularities and boundary conditions (such as Dirichlet boundary conditions or Neumann boundary conditions). On regions without boundaries, adding the real or imaginary part of any entire function will produce a harmonic function with the same singularity, so in this case the harmonic function is not determined by its singularities; however, we can make the solution unique in physical situations by requiring that the solution approaches 0 as r approaches infinity. In this case, uniqueness follows by Liouville's theorem.

The singular points of the harmonic functions above are expressed as "charges" and "charge densities" using the terminology of electrostatics, and so the corresponding harmonic function will be proportional to the electrostatic potential due to these charge distributions. Each function above will yield another harmonic function when multiplied by a constant, rotated, and/or has a constant added. The inversion of each function will yield another harmonic function which has singularities which are the images of the original singularities in a spherical "mirror". Also, the sum of any two harmonic functions will yield another harmonic function.

Finally, examples of harmonic functions of  variables are:

Properties 

The set of harmonic functions on a given open set  can be seen as the kernel of the Laplace operator  and is therefore a vector space over  linear combinations of harmonic functions are again harmonic.

The Laplace operator  and the partial derivative operator will commute on this class of functions.

In several ways, the harmonic functions are real analogues to holomorphic functions. All harmonic functions are analytic, that is, they can be locally expressed as power series. This is a general fact about elliptic operators, of which the Laplacian is a major example.

The uniform limit of a convergent sequence of harmonic functions is still harmonic. This is true because every continuous function satisfying the mean value property is harmonic. Consider the sequence on  defined by  this sequence is harmonic and converges uniformly to the zero function; however note that the partial derivatives are not uniformly convergent to the zero function (the derivative of the zero function). This  example shows the importance of relying on the mean value property and continuity to argue that the limit is harmonic.

Connections with complex function theory 
This is immediately seen observing that, writing  the complex function  is holomorphic in  because it satisfies the Cauchy–Riemann equations.

Although the above correspondence with holomorphic functions only holds for functions of  two real variables, harmonic functions in  variables still enjoy a number of properties typical of holomorphic functions. They are (real) analytic; they have a maximum principle and a mean-value principle; a theorem of removal of singularities as well as a Liouville theorem holds for them in analogy to the corresponding theorems in complex functions theory.

Properties of harmonic functions 
Some important properties of harmonic functions can be deduced from Laplace's equation.

Regularity theorem for harmonic functions 
Harmonic functions are infinitely differentiable in open sets.  In fact, harmonic functions are real analytic.

Maximum principle 
If  is connected, this means that  cannot have local maxima or minima, other than the exceptional case where  is constant. Similar properties can be shown for subharmonic functions.

The mean value property 
In other words,

Conversely, all locally integrable functions satisfying the (volume) mean-value property are both infinitely differentiable and harmonic.

In terms of convolutions, if

denotes the characteristic function of the ball with radius  about the origin, normalized so that  the function  is harmonic on  if and only if

as soon as 

Sketch of the proof. The proof of the mean-value property of the harmonic functions and its converse follows immediately observing that the non-homogeneous equation, for any 

Thus, if  is harmonic in 

Moreover,

 

This statement of the mean value property can be generalized as follows: If  is any spherically symmetric function supported in  such that  then  In other words, we can take the weighted average of  about a point and recover . See Weyl's lemma.

Harnack's inequality 
Let  be a non-negative harmonic function in a bounded domain .  Then for every connected set

Harnack's inequality 

Removal of singularities 
The following principle of removal of singularities holds for harmonic functions.

Liouville's theorem 

(Compare Liouville's theorem for functions of a complex variable).

Edward Nelson gave a particularly short proof of this theorem for the case of bounded functions, using the mean value property mentioned above: 
Given two points, choose two balls with the given points as centers and of equal radius.  If the radius is large enough, the two balls will coincide except for an arbitrarily small proportion of their volume. Since  is bounded, the averages of it over the two balls are arbitrarily close, and so  assumes the same value at any two points.  
The proof can be adapted to the case where the harmonic function  is merely bounded above or below. By adding a constant and possibly multiplying by –1, we may assume that  is non-negative.

By the averaging property and the monotonicity of the integral, we have

But as  the quantity 
 
tends to 1.

Another proof uses the fact that given a Brownian motion  in  such that  we have  for all . In words, it says that a harmonic function defines a martingale for the Brownian motion. Then a probabilistic coupling argument finishes the proof.

Generalizations

Weakly harmonic function
A function (or, more generally, a distribution) is weakly harmonic if it satisfies Laplace's equation

in a weak sense (or, equivalently, in the sense of distributions).  A weakly harmonic function coincides almost everywhere with a strongly harmonic function, and is in particular smooth.  A weakly harmonic distribution is precisely the distribution associated to a strongly harmonic function, and so also is smooth.  This is Weyl's lemma.

There are other weak formulations of Laplace's equation that are often useful.  One of which is Dirichlet's principle, representing harmonic functions in the Sobolev space  as the minimizers of the Dirichlet energy integral

with respect to local variations, that is, all functions  such that  holds for all  or equivalently, for all

Harmonic functions on manifolds
Harmonic functions can be defined on an arbitrary Riemannian manifold, using the Laplace–Beltrami operator . In this context, a function is called harmonic if 

Many of the properties of harmonic functions on domains in Euclidean space carry over to this more general setting, including the mean value theorem (over geodesic balls), the maximum principle, and the Harnack inequality.  With the exception of the mean value theorem, these are easy consequences of the corresponding results for general linear elliptic partial differential equations of the second order.

Subharmonic functions
A  function that satisfies  is called subharmonic.  This condition guarantees that the maximum principle will hold, although other properties of harmonic functions may fail.  More generally, a function is subharmonic if and only if, in the interior of any ball in its domain, its graph lies below that of the harmonic function interpolating its boundary values on the ball.

Harmonic forms
One generalization of the study of harmonic functions is the study of harmonic forms on Riemannian manifolds, and it is related to the study of cohomology. Also, it is possible to define harmonic vector-valued functions, or harmonic maps of two Riemannian manifolds, which are critical points of a generalized Dirichlet energy functional (this includes harmonic functions as a special case, a result known as  Dirichlet principle). This kind of harmonic map appears in the theory of minimal surfaces.

Harmonic maps between manifolds

Important special cases of harmonic maps between manifolds include minimal surfaces, which are precisely the harmonic immersions of a surface into three-dimensional Euclidean space.  More generally, minimal submanifolds are harmonic immersions of one manifold in another.  Harmonic coordinates are a harmonic diffeomorphism from a manifold to an open subset of a Euclidean space of the same dimension.

See also

Balayage
Biharmonic map
Dirichlet problem
Harmonic morphism
Harmonic polynomial
Heat equation
Laplace equation for irrotational flow
Poisson's equation
Quadrature domains

Notes

References 
 .
 .
 .
 .
 .

External links 
 
 
 Harmonic Function Theory by S.Axler, Paul Bourdon, and Wade Ramey